Jerry Mays (born December 8, 1967) is a former player in the NFL. He played for the San Diego Chargers. He played collegiately for the Georgia Tech football team.

High school
Mays remains both the all time and single season rushing leader at Thomson High School in Thomson, Georgia.  While at Thomson Mays had over 1,000 yards twice in his career.  During the 1983 season he finished with 1,666 yards and the 1984 season with a whopping 2,369 yards.

College 
Mays played college football at Georgia Tech.  After being offered a scholarship by only one Division I-A school he was the 1985 ACC Rookie of the Year under Coach Bill Curry. Through the 2006 season Mays was still 2nd all time on the Georgia Tech career rushing yards list with 3,699.  He was inducted into the Georgia Tech Hall of Fame in 1997.

1985: 104 carries for 566 yards and 3 touchdowns. 9 catches for 95 yards and 1 touchdown. 5 kick returns for 134 yards.
1986: 148 carries for 842 yards and 7 touchdowns. 23 catches for 161 yards and 3 touchdowns.
1988: 194 carries for 942 yards and 9 touchdowns. 46 catches for 338 yards and 2 touchdowns.
1989: 249 carries for 1349 yards and 8 touchdowns. 37 catches for 275 yards and 4 touchdowns.

Professional 
Mays played in two games during the 1990 season for the Chargers of the NFL.

Awards and honors 
Georgia Tech Athletics Hall of Fame (1997)
ACC Rookie of the Year (1985) 
Georgia Tech 2nd All-Time Rushing yards leader (1985–1989) 
Thomson High School (GA) All-Time Rushing Yards Leader (1982–1984) - 4,741 yards 
Thomson High School (GA) Single-Season Rushing Yards Leader (1984) - 2,369 
1989 All ACC “Atlantic Coast Conference”
1990 Japan Bowl “ramblinwreck.cstv.com”
2017 Thomson High School Wall of Fame

References

Living people
1967 births
American football running backs
Georgia Tech Yellow Jackets football players
San Diego Chargers players
Players of American football from Augusta, Georgia